The 1955 Yugoslav First Basketball League season is the 11th season of the Yugoslav First Basketball League, the highest professional basketball league in SFR Yugoslavia.

Regular season

League table

Winning Roster  
The winning roster of Crvena Zvezda:
  Đorđe Konjović
  Borko Jovanović
  Branko Nešić
  Ladislav Demšar
  Đorđe Andrijašević
  Dragan Godžić
  Obren Popović
  Borislav Ćurčić
  Milan Bjegojević
  Vojislav Pavasović
  Miroljub Čavić
  Radivoje Ostojić

Coach:  Nebojša Popović

External links  
 Yugoslav First Basketball League Archive 

Yugoslav First Basketball League seasons